Aksenovo or Aksyonovo is the name of several rural localities in Russia.

Modern localities

Altai Krai
As of 2012, one rural locality in Altai Krai bears this name:
Aksenovo, Altai Krai, a selo in Martynovsky Selsoviet of Yeltsovsky District;

Arkhangelsk Oblast
As of 2012, one rural locality in Arkhangelsk Oblast bears this name:
Aksenovo, Arkhangelsk Oblast, a village in Yertsevsky Selsoviet of Konoshsky District

Republic of Bashkortostan
As of 2012, one rural locality in the Republic of Bashkortostan bears this name:
Aksenovo, Republic of Bashkortostan, a selo in Aksenovsky Selsoviet of Alsheyevsky District

Ivanovo Oblast
As of 2012, one rural locality in Ivanovo Oblast bears this name:
Aksenovo, Ivanovo Oblast, a village in Verkhnelandekhovsky District

Kaluga Oblast
As of 2012, one rural locality in Kaluga Oblast bears this name:
Aksenovo, Kaluga Oblast, a village in Iznoskovsky District

Kirov Oblast
As of 2012, three rural localities in Kirov Oblast bear this name:
Aksenovo, Afanasyevsky District, Kirov Oblast, a village in Pashinsky Rural Okrug of Afanasyevsky District; 
Aksenovo, Kiknursky District, Kirov Oblast, a village in Potnyakovsky Rural Okrug of Kiknursky District; 
Aksenovo, Sovetsky District, Kirov Oblast, a village in Zashizhemsky Rural Okrug of Sovetsky District;

Kostroma Oblast
As of 2012, three rural localities in Kostroma Oblast bear this name:
Aksenovo, Chukhlomsky District, Kostroma Oblast (or Aksyonovo), a village in Nozhkinskoye Settlement of Chukhlomsky District; 
Aksenovo, Galichsky District, Kostroma Oblast (or Aksyonovo), a village in Dmitriyevskoye Settlement of Galichsky District; 
Aksenovo, Sharyinsky District, Kostroma Oblast (or Aksyonovo), a village in Ivanovskoye Settlement of Sharyinsky District;

Krasnoyarsk Krai
As of 2012, one rural locality in Krasnoyarsk Krai bears this name:
Aksenovo, Krasnoyarsk Krai, a village in Kezhemsky District

Republic of Mordovia
As of 2012, one rural locality in the Republic of Mordovia bears this name:
Aksenovo, Republic of Mordovia, a selo in Aksenovsky Selsoviet of Lyambirsky District;

Moscow Oblast
As of 2012, seven rural localities in Moscow Oblast bear this name:
Aksenovo, Klinsky District, Moscow Oblast, a village in Voroninskoye Rural Settlement of Klinsky District; 
Aksenovo, Lukhovitsky District, Moscow Oblast, a village in Golovachevskoye Rural Settlement of Lukhovitsky District; 
Aksenovo, Orekhovo-Zuyevsky District, Moscow Oblast (or Aksyonovo), a village in Belavinskoye Rural Settlement of Orekhovo-Zuyevsky District; 
Aksenovo, Ramensky District, Moscow Oblast, a village in Vyalkovskoye Rural Settlement of Ramensky District; 
Aksenovo, Shchyolkovsky District, Moscow Oblast (or Aksyonovo), a village under the administrative jurisdiction of Fryanovo Work Settlement in Shchyolkovsky District; 
Aksenovo, Chismenskoye Rural Settlement, Volokolamsky District, Moscow Oblast, a village in Chismenskoye Rural Settlement of Volokolamsky District; 
Aksenovo, Yaropoletskoye Rural Settlement, Volokolamsky District, Moscow Oblast, a village in Yaropoletskoye Rural Settlement of Volokolamsky District;

Nizhny Novgorod Oblast
As of 2012, four rural localities in Nizhny Novgorod Oblast bear this name:
Aksenovo, Semyonov, Nizhny Novgorod Oblast, a village in Ogibnovsky Selsoviet under the administrative jurisdiction of the town of oblast significance of Semyonov
Aksenovo, Gorodetsky District, Nizhny Novgorod Oblast, a village in Smirkinsky Selsoviet of Gorodetsky District
Aksenovo, Sokolsky District, Nizhny Novgorod Oblast, a village in Loyminsky Selsoviet of Sokolsky District
Aksenovo, Urensky District, Nizhny Novgorod Oblast, a village in Semenovsky Selsoviet of Urensky District

Omsk Oblast
As of 2012, two rural localities in Omsk Oblast bear this name:
Aksenovo, Sargatsky District, Omsk Oblast, a village in Uvalobitiinsky Rural Okrug of Sargatsky District
Aksenovo, Ust-Ishimsky District, Omsk Oblast, a settlement in Utuskunsky Rural Okrug of Ust-Ishimsky District

Perm Krai
As of 2012, one rural locality in Perm Krai bears this name:
Aksenovo, Perm Krai, a selo in Yusvinsky District

Pskov Oblast
As of 2012, five rural localities in Pskov Oblast bear this name:
Aksenovo, Bezhanitsky District, Pskov Oblast, a village in Bezhanitsky District
Aksenovo, Nevelsky District, Pskov Oblast, a village in Nevelsky District
Aksenovo, Palkinsky District, Pskov Oblast, a village in Palkinsky District
Aksenovo, Pushkinogorsky District, Pskov Oblast, a village in Pushkinogorsky District
Aksenovo, Sebezhsky District, Pskov Oblast, a village in Sebezhsky District

Ryazan Oblast
As of 2012, two rural localities in Ryazan Oblast bear this name:
Aksenovo, Kasimovsky District, Ryazan Oblast, a village in Pustynsky Rural Okrug of Kasimovsky District
Aksenovo, Rybnovsky District, Ryazan Oblast, a village in Kuzminsky Rural Okrug of Rybnovsky District

Smolensk Oblast
As of 2012, one rural locality in Smolensk Oblast bears this name:
Aksenovo, Smolensk Oblast, a village in Prechistenskoye Rural Settlement of Dukhovshchinsky District

Tomsk Oblast
As of 2012, one rural locality in Tomsk Oblast bears this name:
Aksenovo, Tomsk Oblast, a village in Tomsky District

Tver Oblast
As of 2012, three rural localities in Tver Oblast bear this name:
Aksenovo, Andreapolsky District, Tver Oblast, a village in Aksenovskoye Rural Settlement of Andreapolsky District
Aksenovo, Torzhoksky District, Tver Oblast, a village in Sukromlenskoye Rural Settlement of Torzhoksky District
Aksenovo, Zharkovsky District, Tver Oblast, a village in Shchucheyskoye Rural Settlement of Zharkovsky District

Vladimir Oblast
As of 2012, four rural localities in Vladimir Oblast bear this name:
Aksenovo, Gus-Khrustalny District, Vladimir Oblast, a village in Gus-Khrustalny District
Aksenovo, Petushinsky District, Vladimir Oblast, a village in Petushinsky District
Aksenovo, Sudogodsky District, Vladimir Oblast, a village in Sudogodsky District
Aksenovo, Vyaznikovsky District, Vladimir Oblast, a village in Vyaznikovsky District

Vologda Oblast
As of 2012, eleven rural localities in Vologda Oblast bear this name:
Aksenovo, Babayevsky District, Vologda Oblast, a village in Kuysky Selsoviet of Babayevsky District
Aksenovo, Babushkinsky District, Vologda Oblast, a village in Ledengsky Selsoviet of Babushkinsky District
Aksenovo, Abakanovsky Selsoviet, Cherepovetsky District, Vologda Oblast, a village in Abakanovsky Selsoviet of Cherepovetsky District
Aksenovo, Musorsky Selsoviet, Cherepovetsky District, Vologda Oblast, a village in Musorsky Selsoviet of Cherepovetsky District
Aksenovo, Frolovsky Selsoviet, Gryazovetsky District, Vologda Oblast, a village in Frolovsky Selsoviet of Gryazovetsky District
Aksenovo, Vokhtogsky Selsoviet, Gryazovetsky District, Vologda Oblast, a village in Vokhtogsky Selsoviet of Gryazovetsky District
Aksenovo, Kirillovsky District, Vologda Oblast, a village in Sukhoverkhovsky Selsoviet of Kirillovsky District
Aksenovo, Charomsky Selsoviet, Sheksninsky District, Vologda Oblast, a village in Charomsky Selsoviet of Sheksninsky District
Aksenovo, Fominsky Selsoviet, Sheksninsky District, Vologda Oblast, a village in Fominsky Selsoviet of Sheksninsky District
Aksenovo, Velikoustyugsky District, Vologda Oblast, a village in Yudinsky Selsoviet of Velikoustyugsky District
Aksenovo, Vologodsky District, Vologda Oblast, a village in Staroselsky Selsoviet of Vologodsky District

Yaroslavl Oblast
As of 2012, two rural localities in Yaroslavl Oblast bear this name:
Aksenovo, Nekrasovsky District, Yaroslavl Oblast, a village in Grebovsky Rural Okrug of Nekrasovsky District
Aksenovo, Rybinsky District, Yaroslavl Oblast, a selo in Volzhsky Rural Okrug of Rybinsky District

Alternative names
Aksenovo, alternative name of Aksanovo, a village in Goretovskoye Rural Settlement of Mozhaysky District in Moscow Oblast;

Other uses
 Aksyonovo railway station

See also
Aksenov (rural locality)
Aksenovka